Sakthi N Chidambaram (born Dinakar), is an Indian film director, who directs Tamil films.

Career

His real name is C. Dhinakaran. He first wrote the dialogues for the films Kottai Vaasal (1992), Veettai Paaru Naattai Paaru (1994), Uzhiyan (1994) and Pathavi Pramanam (1994). Chidambaram made his directorial debut in 1997 with Samrat, starring Ramki, a remake of Hindi film Baazigar. In 1998, he directed the film Vettu Onnu Thundu Rendu, starring Mansoor Ali Khan in the lead role. Both films were failures.

After a gap, he changed his name and directed Ennamma Kannu (2000) with Sathyaraj. The film received mixed reviews and did well. The success of the film prompted director and actor to reunite to make Mr. Narathar with Abbas, Mumtaj and Divyaa Unni also joining the cast. Despite nearly completing shoot, the project was shelved and remains unreleased. His next directorial project, Charlie Chaplin (2002), was a hit, and its success led to various remakes in other languages. He created a record in Tamil cinema as it became the first to be remade in six Indian languages, including in Bollywood. His other projects, Inidhu Inidhu Kadhal Inidhu (2003) and Kadhal Kirukkan (2003), became box office disasters.

In 2004, he again collaborated with Sathyaraj with Maha Nadigan, a satire on cinema and politics. The film faced controversy prior to its release for its mockery of Tamil actors and politicians. In late 2004, he agreed to collaborate with Sathyaraj again in a project titled Saddam Hussein, but the project did not continue. In 2005, he briefly worked on the production of a film titled Pattasu with Sibiraj, Vikranth and Chaya Singh, but the film did not complete production.

Sakthi again directed Sathyaraj in Englishkaran (2005) and Kovai Brothers (2006), both successful. Sakthi has produced five screenplays which are Kovai Brothers (2006), Viyabari (2007), Sandai (2008), Rajadhi Raja (2009) and Guru Sishyan (2010). For the movie Kaavalan (2011), Sakthi bought Tamil Nadu rights.

In 2012, Sakthi Chidambaram began work on a film titled Machan and immediately speculation arose that Namitha, who has appeared in several of the director's previous films as well as being closely associated with the title, would play a pivotal part in the film. It was later announced that Siva Karthikeyan would play the lead role in the film alongside Dhansika, though the pair were later replaced by a new cast including Ramesh Aravind and comedians Vivek and Karunas. Despite the release of a trailer and soundtrack, the film did not have a theatrical release.
 
His next Charlie Chaplin 2 (2019), a comedy entertainer and a sequel to his 2002 blockbuster with the same name. But this sequel has no connection to the original except Prabhu Deva and Prabhu.

Filmography 

As director

As actor

As writer
Kottai Vaasal (1992)
Veettai Paar Naattai Paar (1994)
Uzhiyan (1994)
Pathavi Pramanam (1994)

As producer
Kovai Brothers (2006)
Viyabari (2007)
Pazhani (2008) 
Sandai (2008)
Rajadhi Raja (2009)
Guru Sishyan (2010)

As distributor
Shakthi N Chidambaramhas bought the Tamil Nadu rights for Kaavalan (2011).

As lyricist

Controversy
Shakthi N Chidambaram lashed out at actress Suhasini for giving bad reviews of his film Rajadhi Raja (2009).

References 

20th-century Indian film directors
Living people
Tamil film directors
21st-century Indian film directors
Male actors in Tamil cinema
Year of birth missing (living people)